P3AT may refer to:
Polythiophene
Kel-Tec P3AT semi-automatic handgun